= Kalakeri =

Village in Karnataka, India

Coordinates: 16°40′N 76°18′E

Kalakeri is a village in Bijapur of Karnataka, India.
